Dendrobium lichenastrum, commonly known as the common button orchid, is a species of epiphytic or lithophytic orchid endemic to far north Queensland. It has a creeping, branching rhizome surrounded by papery bracts, small egg-shaped to round, fleshy, dark green leaves and a single white, cream-coloured or pink flower with red stripes and an orange labellum.

Description
The petals are linear in shape, a similar length to the sepals but much narrower. Flowering occurs sporadically throughout the year.

Taxonomy and naming
The common button orchid was first formally described in 1901 by Ferdinand von Mueller who gave it the name Bulbophyllum lichenastrum and published the description in Fragmenta phytographiae Australiae from a specimen collected by John Dallachy near Rockingham Bay. In 1905 Robert Allen Rolfe changed the name to Dendrobium lichenastrum. The specific epithet (lichenastrum) is derived from the Ancient Greek words leichen meaning "a lichen" and astron meaning "a star".

Distribution and habitat
Dendrobium lichenastrum grows on rocks, cliffs and trees in rainforest between Mount Finnigan and Mackay.

References

lichenastrum
Orchids of Queensland
Endemic orchids of Australia
Plants described in 1870
Taxa named by Ferdinand von Mueller